Mitsuaki Watanabe is a Japanese artistic gymnast. He won the bronze medal on horizontal bars at the 1985 World Artistic Gymnastics Championships in Montreal, placing behind Tong Fei and Sylvio Kroll. This was his second World Championship medal after being on the bronze medal-winning Japanese team in the 1983 Budapest World Championships.

References 

Japanese male artistic gymnasts
Medalists at the World Artistic Gymnastics Championships
Year of birth missing (living people)
Living people
20th-century Japanese people